Yuvna Kim is a Mauritian-born, London-based fashion designer, model, and TV entertainment journalist.

Early life and education 
Born Yuvna Kim Currun on the island of Mauritius, Kim is the eldest daughter of English Literature teacher and former member of the National Assembly Devendra Kim Currun and Vinitta Kim Currun, who raised Kim and her sister in the town of Vacoas-Phoenix, in the Plaines Wilhems District of Mauritius Island.

In 2002 Kim attended the Faculty of Law at University College London. She pursued a brief career in the legal professions.

Career 
Kim started as a model and an actor. Kim was the face of Sony Entertainment Television Asia and the host of the fashion segment on SNAPSHOT between 2010 and 2013.

In 2012, Kim launched her London-based fashion label Yuvna Kim London, specialising in bridal couture and Red Carpet gowns.

In 2015, she showcased her designs at the London's Fashion Week.

References

External links
Official Site

Living people
British fashion designers
High fashion brands
1984 births
Alumni of University College London